Michel Prévost (7 August 1925 – 1 August 2016) was a French sports shooter. He competed at the 1956 Summer Olympics and the 1964 Summer Olympics.

References

1925 births
2016 deaths
French male sport shooters
Olympic shooters of France
Shooters at the 1956 Summer Olympics
Shooters at the 1964 Summer Olympics
Place of birth missing